Bellona Publishing House (formerly also Dom Wydawniczy Bellona) is a private publishing house based in Warsaw, Poland. It was created in 1990 from restructuring of the state-run Wydawnictwo MON. It specialises in books on military history. Bellona issues more than 300 books yearly. It is also the publisher of Mówią Wieki, a monthly historical magazine established in 1958.

Wydawnictwo MON
Wydawnictwo MON (Wydawnictwo Ministerstwa Obrony Narodowej, lit. Publishing House of the Ministry of National Defense) was  founded in 1947 and until 1952 its official title was Wydawnictwo Ministerstwa Obrony Narodowej „Prasa Wojskowa" (lit. Publishing House of the Ministry of National Defense "Military Press"). It released books related to military subjects, such as memoirs of veterans or monographs on battles or military units.

In 1976 the publishing house received the Commanders Cross of the Polonia Restituta.

Around 1989–1990 it was restructured into the Bellona Publishing House.

References

Exterlan links
  

Book publishing companies of Poland
Companies based in Warsaw
Mass media in Warsaw
Publishing companies established in 1990
Military of Poland
1947 establishments in Poland
Polish companies established in 1990